Osteochilus waandersii is a cyprinid freshwater fish from Southeast Asia. It is found in Indochina (including the lower Mekong River and Chao Phraya River) as well as in Sumatra and Borneo. Its common name is Waanders's hard-lipped barb.

Etymology
The specific name waandersii honours Henri Louis van Bloemen Waanders (1821–1883), administrator of the tin mines of Bangka Island, off Sumatra.

Habitat 
It inhabits submontane streams to highland waterfalls. It is migratory in larger river systems. It can move into flooded forests adjacent to upland streams.

Description
Osteochilus waandersii  has a well-defined black stripe along the sides, running from the gill opening to the end of the median caudal fin rays. Caudal, dorsal, anal, and pelvic fins are bright orange or red. It grows to  TL.

Utilization 
Osteochilus waandersii is present in local small-scale fisheries and occasionally in aquarium trade.

References 

Osteochilus
Fish of the Mekong Basin
Fish of Cambodia
Freshwater fish of Indonesia
Fish of Laos
Freshwater fish of Malaysia
Fish of Thailand
Fish of Vietnam
Freshwater fish of Borneo
Freshwater fish of Sumatra
Fish described in 1853
Taxa named by Pieter Bleeker